The Diocese of Sabina–Poggio Mirteto is a suburbicarian see of the Holy Roman Church (which means it carries the rare rank of cardinal-bishop) and a diocese of the Catholic Church in Italy in the Roman province of the Pope.

History 

Sabina has been the seat of such a bishopric since the 6th century, though the earliest names in the list of bishops may be apocryphal.

The ancient cathedral of San Salvatore of Sabina was located in Forum Novum (Vescovio).
 
The official papal province of Sabina was established under Pope Paul V in 1605.

Since 1842 the Cardinal Bishop of Sabina also bears the title of Territorial Abbot of Farfa.
 
Since 1925, the cardinalatial Titular Church of Sabina has been united to that of Poggio Mirteto, and officially named Sabina e Poggio Mirteto, since 1986 Sabina–Poggio Mirteto. The current Cardinal-Bishop is Giovanni Battista Re, while the Ordinary of the Diocese is Bishop Ernesto Mandara.

Cardinal-bishops of Sabina 

If ?, century or c. is given, exact years or dates have not yet been found for his tenure.

 To 1000 
Mariano (721)
Pietro (778 to before 799)
Issa (or Jesse) (799 to before 804)
Teodoro (804 to before 826)
Samuele (826 before 853)
Sergio (853–868, or before 879)
Leone (879 to before 928)
Gregorio (928 to before 948)
Anastasio (948 to before 963)
Giovanni (963to before 984)
Giovanni (984 to before 993)
Domenico (993)
Benedetto (999)
Rainiero (999–1011)

 1000 to 1300 

John of Crescenzi, future Pope (or Antipope) Sylvester III (1011–1062)
Ubaldo (1063–1094), first cardinal-bishop
Regizzone (Regizzo) (1084/90–1092/97), pseudocardinal
Crescenzio, seniore (1100–1106)
Crescenzio, iuniore (1117-1126)
Corrado della Suburra (1127/28–1153)
Gregorio (1154)
Gregorio de Suburra (1154–1163)
Conrad of Wittelsbach (1166–1200)
 Giovanni (1172–1173), pseudocardinal of Antipope Callisto III
Giovanni di San Paolo (1204–1214)
Peter of Benevento (1217–1220)
Aldobrandino Orsini (1221)
Olivier von Paderborn (1225–1227)
Jean Halgrin d'Abbeville, O.Clun. (1227–1237)
Goffredo da Castiglione, (1238–1241) 
William of Modena (1244–1251)
Pierre de Bar (de Barro), Cistercian (1251/52–1253)
Guido il Grosso (Guy le Gros) 1261–1265, elected Pope Clement IV
Bertrand de Saint-Martin, Benedictine (1273–1277 or 1278)
Gerardo Bianchi (1281–1302)

 1300–1500 

Pedro Rodríguez (1302–1310)
Arnaud de Falguières (Faugères) (1310–1317)
Guillaume Pierre Godin, Dominican (1317–1336)
Matteo Orsini, Dominican (1338–1340)
Pedro Gòmez de Barroso (1341–1348)
Bertrand de Déaulx (1348–1355)
Egidio Albornoz (1356–1367)
Guillaume d'Aigrefeuille, Benedictine (1367–1369)
Philippe de Cabassoles (1370–1372)
Jean de Blandiac (1372–1379)Hughes de Montelais (or Montrelaix) the younger, called de Bretagne (the obedience of Avignon 1379–1384)Pierre de Sortenac (or de Bernier) (the obedience of Avignon 1384–1390)Philippe Valois d'Alençon (Philippe d'Alençon) second son of Charles II, Count of Alençon (1380–1388) (deposed and reinstated by Pope Urban VI)Jaime de Aragón (the obedience of Avignon 1391–1392)Francesco Carbone Tomacelli, Cistercian (1405)
Enrico Minutoli (or Minutolo) (1409–1412)Jean Flandrin (the obedience of Avignon 1405–1415)Pedro Fernández (de Frías) (1412–1420)   
Francesco Lando (1424–1427)
Giordano Orsini (1431–1438)
Branda da Castiglione (1440–1443)
Basilios Bessarion (1449)
Amedeo di Savoia (1449–1451), served as antipope Felix V 1439–1449
Isidore of Kiev (Isidoro da Tessalonica) (1451–1462)
Juan de Torquemada (1463–1468)
Basilios Bessarion (again) (1468–1472)
Alain de Coëtivy (1472–1474)
Berardo Eroli (1474–1479)
Giuliano della Rovere (1479–1483) (later Pope Julius II)
Oliviero Carafa (1483–1503)

 1500–1700 

Girolamo Basso della Rovere (1503–1507)
Raffaele Riario (1507–1508)
Giovanni Antonio Sangiorgio (1508–1509) 
Bernardino López de Carvajal (1509–1511, deposed, again 1513–1521)
Francesco Soderini (1511–1513) 
Niccolò Fieschi (1521–1523)
Alessandro Farnese (1523–1524)
Antonio Maria Ciocchi del Monte (1524)
Pietro Accolti (1524–1532)
Giovanni Domenico de Cupis (1533–1535)
Bonifacio Ferrero (1535–1537)
Lorenzo Campeggio (1537–1539)
Antonio Sanseverino (1539–1543)
Antonio Pucci (1543–1544)
Giovanni Salviati (1544–1546)
Giovanni Pietro Carafa (1546–1550) (later Pope Paul IV)
François de Tournon (1550–1560)
Robert de Lenoncourt
Giovanni Morone (1561–1562)
Alessandro Farnese (1564–1565)
Ranuccio Farnese (1565)
Cristoforo Madruzzo, sometime between 1567 and 1578
Tiberio Crispo (1565–1566)
Giovanni Michele Saraceni (1566–1569)
Giovanni Battista Cicala (o Cicada) (1569–1570)
Otto Truchsess von Waldburg (1570)
Giulio della Rovere (1570–1573)
Giovanni Ricci (1573–1574)
Scipione Rebiba (1574–1577)
Giacomo Savelli (1577–1578)
Giovanni Antonio Serbelloni (1578)
Antoine Perrenot de Granvelle (1578–1586)
Innico d'Avalos d'Aragona Ordine di San Giacomo (1586–1589)
Tolomeo Gallio (1589–1591)
Gabriele Paleotti (1591–1597)
Ludovico Madruzzo (1597–1600)
Girolamo Rusticucci (1600–1603)
Simeone Tagliavia d'Aragonia (1603–1604)
François de Joyeuse (1604–1611)
Antonimaria Sauli (1611–1615)
Benedetto Giustiniani (1615–1620)
Pietro Aldobrandini (1620–1621)
Odoardo Farnese (1621–1623)
Bonifazio Bevilacqua Aldobrandini (1623–1626)
Carlo Gaudenzio Madruzzo (1626–1629)
Scipione Borghese (1629–1633)
Felice Centini, OFMConv] (1633–1641)
Francesco Cennini de' Salamandri (1641–1645)
Carlo de' Medici (1645), Giovanni Carlo de' Medici
Francesco Barberini (1645–1652)
Bernardino Spada (1652–1655)
Giulio Cesare Sacchetti (1655–1663)
Marzio Ginetti (1663–1666)
Francesco Maria Brancaccio (1666–1668)
Giulio Gabrielli (1668–1677)
Niccolò Albergati-Ludovisi (1677–1681)
Pietro Vito Ottoboni (1681–1683) 
Carlo Pio di Savoia (iuniore) (1683–1689)
Paluzzo Paluzzi Altieri degli Albertoni (1689–1691)
Giannicolò Conti (1691–1698)
Gasparo Carpegna (1698–1714)

 1700–1925 

Fulvio Astalli (1714–1719)
Francesco Pignatelli (1719–1724)
Francesco Acquaviva d'Aragona (1724–1725)
Pietro Ottoboni (1725–1730)
Annibale Albani (1730–1743)
Vincenzo Bichi (1743–1747)
Raniero d'Elci (1747–1753)
Silvio Valenti Gonzaga (1753–1756)
Joaquín Fernàndez de Portocarrero Mendoza (1756–1760)
Gian Francesco Albani (1760–1773)
Carlo Rezzonico iuniore (1773–1776)
Andrea Corsini (1776–1795)
Giovanni Archinto (1795–1799)
Giovanni Andrea Archetti (1800–1805)
Ippolito Antonio Vincenti Mareri (1807–1811)
Lorenzo Litta (1814–1820)
Tomasso Arezzo (1820–1833)
Carlo Odescalchi (1833–1838)
Antonio Domenico Gamberini (1839–1841)
Luigi Emmanuele Nicolo Lambruschini (1842–1847)
Giacomo Luigi Brignole (1847–1853)
Gabriele Ferretti (1853–1860)
Girolamo D'Andrea (1860–1868)
Karl August von Reisach (1868–1869)
Giuseppe Milesi Pironi Ferretti (1870–1873)
Luigi Bilio, Barnabite (1873–1884)
Tommaso Martinelli, OSA (1884–1888)
Luigi Serafini (1888–1894)
Mario Mocenni (1894–1904)
Francesco di Paola Cassetta (1905–1911)
Gaetano de Lai (1911–1925 see below)

 Cardinal-bishops of Sabina-Poggio Mirteto 
Gaetano de Lai (see above'' 1925–1928) 
Donato Sbarretti (1928–1939)
Enrico Sibilia (1939–1948)
Adeodato Giovanni Piazza (1949–1957)
Marcello Mimmi (1958–1961)
Giuseppe Ferretto (1961–1973)
Antonio Samoré (1974–1983)
Agnelo Rossi (1984–1995)
Eduardo Francisco Pironio (1995–1998)
Lucas Moreira Neves (1998–2002)
Giovanni Battista Re (from 2002)

References

Books

Sources and external links
 Suburbicarian Diocese of Sabina-Poggio Mirteto Official Website
 Complete list
 Konrad Eubel, Hierarchia Catholica Medii Aevi, vol. I-IV

Suburbicarian dioceses
Dioceses established in the 5th century
Roman Catholic dioceses in Lazio